La taverna della libertà is a 1950 Italian film directed by Maurice Cam.

Cast
Umberto Spadaro
André Le Gall
Jacqueline Plessis
Giulio Stival
Jone Salinas
Memo Benassi
Armando Migliari
Enrico Glori
Gianni Santuccio
Marco Vicario

References

External links
 
 La taverna delle libertà at Variety Distribution

1950 films
Italian drama films
1950s Italian-language films
Films set in the 19th century
1950s Italian films